Madhaul Khurd  is a village in Desri community development block in Vaishali district  in the Indian state of Bihar.  The main Post office is Desari and pin code of Madhaul is 844504

Demography
The total population of the village is 1,010 as per 2001 census. The overall literacy rate is 68.86% . The female literacy rate is 50.51% while the male literacy rate is 85.1%.

Education
The college in Desri Block named Sant Kabir Mahant Ram Dayal Das Intermediate Mahavidalay, Bidupur. GPS Madhaul Khurd is the government school in the village.

Economy
The Village had been electrified under the Grameen Vidutikaran yojana.

Geography

Transport
Desari railway station is the main railway station here.

Culture
Apart from the language Hindi, the local language spoken by the people is Bajjika.

Festivals
Holi, Durga Puja, Deepawali and Chhath Puja are the prime festivals. People also celebrate Rakshabandhan, Janmashtmi, Shivratri, Makar Sankranti, Saraswati Puja and other local festivals.

References 

Villages in Vaishali district